Conus mercator, common name the trader cone, is a species of sea snail, a marine gastropod mollusk in the family Conidae, the cone snails and their allies.

Like all species within the genus Conus, these snails are predatory and venomous. They are capable of "stinging" humans, therefore live ones should be handled carefully or not at all.

Description
The size of the shell varies between 20 mm and 55 mm. The shell is yellowish or ash-gray, often faintly longitudinally lined with chestnut, with a broad band at the shoulder and a narrower one at the middle, of white closely reticulated with chestnut.

Distribution
This species occurs in the Atlantic Ocean off Senegal.

References

 Linnaeus, C. (1758). Systema Naturae per regna tria naturae, secundum classes, ordines, genera, species, cum characteribus, differentiis, synonymis, locis. Editio decima, reformata. Laurentius Salvius: Holmiae. ii, 824 pp 
 Puillandre N., Duda T.F., Meyer C., Olivera B.M. & Bouchet P. (2015). One, four or 100 genera? A new classification of the cone snails. Journal of Molluscan Studies. 81: 1–23

Gallery
Below are several color forms:

External links
 The Conus Biodiversity website
 Cone Shells - Knights of the Sea
 

mercator
Gastropods described in 1758
Taxa named by Carl Linnaeus